Mario Alberto Trejo León (born August 2, 1971) is a Mexican football manager and former player. He was born in Mexico City. Recently was the manager of Faraones de Texcoco, team that play at Liga TDP.

References

External links

1971 births
Living people
Mexican footballers
Cruz Azul footballers
Association football defenders
Footballers from Mexico City